Klížska Nemá is a village and municipality in the Komárno District in the Nitra Region of south-west Slovakia.

Geography
The village lies at an altitude of 115 metres and covers an area of 11.807 km².
It has a population of about 545 people.

History
In the 9th century, the territory of Boldog became part of the Kingdom of Hungary. In historical records the village was first mentioned in 1268.
After the Austro-Hungarian army disintegrated in November 1918, Czechoslovak troops occupied the area, later acknowledged internationally by the Treaty of Trianon. Between 1938 and 1945 Boldog once more  became part of Miklós Horthy's Hungary through the First Vienna Award. From 1945 until the Velvet Divorce, it was part of Czechoslovakia. Since then it has been part of Slovakia.

Demographics
The village is about 93% Hungarian, 7% Slovak.

Facilities
The village has a public library and a football pitch.

See also
 List of municipalities and towns in Slovakia

References

External links
Surnames of living people in Klizska Nema

Villages and municipalities in the Komárno District
Hungarian communities in Slovakia